Raudnei Anversa Freire (born 18 July 1965) is a former Brazilian football player.

Club statistics

References

External links

 sports.geocities.jp
 
 

1965 births
Living people
Brazilian footballers
Brazilian expatriate footballers
Primeira Liga players
Segunda División players
J1 League players
Kyoto Sanga FC players
Clube Atlético Juventus players
FC Porto players
Deportivo de La Coruña players
C.F. Os Belenenses players
Gil Vicente F.C. players
Guarani FC players
CD Castellón footballers
Esporte Clube Bahia players
Esporte Clube Santo André players
América Futebol Clube (RN) players
Ituano FC players
Associação Desportiva São Caetano players
Paraná Clube players
Associação Atlética Portuguesa (Santos) players
Esporte Clube Juventude players
União São João Esporte Clube players
Expatriate footballers in Portugal
Expatriate footballers in Spain
Expatriate footballers in Japan
Association football forwards